Yuncheng railway station may refer to:

 Yuncheng railway station (郓城站), a railway station in Yuncheng County, Heze, Shandong, China.
 Yuncheng railway station (运城站), a railway station in Yanhu District, Yuncheng, Shanxi, China.